Diadème was the lead ship of the  74-gun ship of the line of the French Navy.

Career 

On 17 March 1757, along with the 64-gun , she captured , commanded by Captain Robert Roddam, off Saint-Domingue. In 1761, she was under Breugnon.

She took part in the naval operations in the American Revolutionary War under de Grasse, notably fighting at the Battle of the Chesapeake under Louis Augustin de Monteclerc.

At the Battle of the Saintes on 12 April 1782 it was the gap between Diadème and the mastless  which allowed  to break the French line. She was severely damaged by Formidable and withdrew from the battle. on 25 April she was one of the ships ordered to rally at Cap Francois on San Domingo with de Vaudreuil's fleet.

On 29 September 1792, she was renamed Brutus.

She was razéed down to a 42-gun frigate in May 1794, and cruised off Groix under Captain Baud-Vachères.

Fate 
Brutus was eventually broken up in 1797.

Sources and references 
 Notes

Citations

Bibliography
 
 

 

External links
 Ships of the line
 

Ships of the line of the French Navy
Diadème-class ships of the line
Ships built in France
1756 ships